The 2013–14 Biathlon World Cup – Mass start Men started at Sunday January 5 in Oberhof and will finish Sunday March 23 in Holmenkollen. Defending titlist is Martin Fourcade of France.

2012-13 Top 3 Standings

Medal winners

Standings

Mass start Men